VV Vlugheid Kracht Westerbork (VKW) is an association football club from Westerbork, Netherlands. It was founded on 8 August 1929. Since 2022, it plays for the first time in the Vierde Divisie (when it scured promotion still known as Hoofdklasse).

References 

Football clubs in the Netherlands
Midden-Drenthe
Football clubs in Drenthe
1929 establishments in the Netherlands
Association football clubs established in 1929